Rémi Walter (born 26 April 1995) is a French professional footballer who plays as a defensive midfielder for Major League Soccer club Sporting Kansas City.

Career
Walter made his full debut with Nancy on 3 August 2013 in a goalless home draw against AJ Auxerre playing the full game. He scored his first goal for Nancy on 30 August 2013 in a 2–3 home defeat against Tours FC.

On 22 December 2020, Walter joined Major League Soccer club Sporting Kansas City. He made his club debut on 17 April 2021 against the New York Red Bulls, starting in a 2–1 victory. Walter played as both central midfielder and defensive midfielder for Sporting in 2021 and 2022.

Career statistics

References

External links
 
 

1995 births
Living people
Association football midfielders
French footballers
French expatriate footballers
France youth international footballers
France under-21 international footballers
AS Nancy Lorraine players
OGC Nice players
ES Troyes AC players
Yeni Malatyaspor footballers
Ligue 2 players
Ligue 1 players
Championnat National 2 players
Championnat National 3 players
Süper Lig players
French expatriate sportspeople in Turkey
Expatriate footballers in Turkey
Sporting Kansas City players
Expatriate soccer players in the United States
French expatriate sportspeople in the United States
Major League Soccer players